Souls Adrift is a 1917 American silent drama film directed by Harley Knoles and starring Ethel Clayton, Milton Sills and Frank DeVernon.

Cast
 Ethel Clayton as Elma Raybourne 
 Milton Sills as Micah Steele 
 Frank DeVernon as Ambrose Raybourne 
 John Davidson as Maberly Todd 
 Walter James as A Swede Sailor

References

Bibliography
 Monaco, James. The Encyclopedia of Film. Perigee Books, 1991.

External links
 

1917 films
1917 drama films
1910s English-language films
American silent feature films
Silent American drama films
Films directed by Harley Knoles
American black-and-white films
World Film Company films
1910s American films